Membrillo is a Spanish language common name for several species of plants:
 Gustavia fosteri, a species of woody plant in the family Lecythidaceae
 Gustavia superba, another species in the genus Gustavia
 Quince fruit
 Dulce de membrillo, quince paste